Khun San Lwin is a Pa'O politician of Burma. He is a former member of the Pa-O National Organization and currently Chairman of the Pa'O Self-Administered Zone. He was appointed to the State Administration Council in 2023.

References

Burmese politicians
Living people
Year of birth missing (living people)